C. Diane Bishop (born November 23, 1943) is an American politician who served as the 16th Superintendent of Public Instruction for the state of Arizona from 1987 to 1995 as a Democrat.

Early life
Bishop was born in Elmhurst, Illinois on November 23, 1943.

Career
Bishop served as Arizona's 16th Superintendent of Public Instruction from 1987 to 1995 as a Democrat, succeeding Carolyn Warner and preceding Lisa Graham Keegan.

References

1943 births
Living people
21st-century American women politicians
Arizona Democrats
Superintendents of Public Instruction of Arizona
Women state constitutional officers of Arizona
People from Elmhurst, Illinois